Mount Joy station is an Amtrak intercity railway station located about 13 miles northwest of Lancaster, Pennsylvania, at East Henry Street and North Market Street in Mount Joy, Pennsylvania. It is served by most Amtrak Keystone Service trains.

The station formerly was a makeshift bus shelter in a railroad cut but replaced by an Americans With Disabilities Act of 1990-accessible platform. There is no ticket office at this station.

Red Rose Transit Authority, based in Lancaster, operates its Route 18 bus through Mount Joy one block from the station.

History

Mount Joy station was rebuilt between 2016 and 2019. The project raised the platforms to reduce dwell time, had platforms be covered with a canopy to protect passengers from the elements, added elevators in order to comply with Americans with Disabilities Act of 1990, and constructed a pedestrian walkway allowing easy access between the platforms. The slope was stabilized while additional parking spaces complemented an earlier phase where 69 parking spaces were added in 2012. Michael Baker International were the architects while Wagman was contracted to construct the new station. The station was rededicated on October 21, 2019 at a cost of $33 million, $8 million more than initially anticipated.

References

External links 

Mt. Joy Amtrak Station (USA RailGuide -- TrainWeb)

Amtrak stations in Pennsylvania
Philadelphia to Harrisburg Main Line